"I'm Looking out the Window" is a ballad written by Don Raye and John Jacob Niles. Peggy Lee first recorded the song as a B-side for her 1959 single "Hallelujah, I Love Him So". The song is best known as a hit record for Cliff Richard in 1962 in numerous countries, although not in the United States.

The authorship of the song has not always been clear. Peggy Lee's original release on Capitol Records was credited to Don Raye. Cliff Richard's release on Columbia was credited to John Jacob Niles. The Songwriter's Hall of Fame now credits it to both.

Cliff Richard version

Cliff Richard with the Norrie Paramor Orchestra recorded it for release as a single in 1962 as I'm Lookin' out the Window. It reached number 2 in the UK Singles Chart and was successful in numerous other countries. It was only Richard's second song released as a single without the backing of his band the Shadows (known as the Drifters on his first five singles).

The song was somewhat overshadowed by its upbeat B-side, "Do You Want to Dance", which gained its own UK chart position of number 10 in the New Musical Express singles chart as it allowed separate listing of B-sides. Notably, it also became the sole or primary listed song of the single in some countries' charts (refer to the Chart performance section below). As was more usual on singles in the early part of Richard's career, "Do You Want to Dance" also featured the Shadows backing Richard.

Chart performance
Chart entries as "I'm Lookin' out the Window" / "Do You Want to Dance":

Chart entries as "Do You Want to Dance" or "Do You Want to Dance" / "I'm Lookin' out the Window":

Other versions
 French singer Francois Feguelt recorded a French version titled "Deja le jour se leve" (1963).
 Nancy Holloway also recorded a version of "Deja le jour se leve" as the B-side of her single "Prends garde a toi".

References

External links
 Cliff Richard Song Database

Cliff Richard songs
1962 singles
Peggy Lee songs
Songs written by Don Raye
1959 songs
Columbia Graphophone Company singles
Song recordings produced by Norrie Paramor
1950s ballads